The 1958–59 Chicago Black Hawks season was the team's 33rd season in the NHL, and the club was coming off of a fifth-place finish in 1957–58, as they finished the year 24–39–7, earning 55 points, which was their highest point total since last making the playoffs in 1952–53.

It was a quiet off-season for the Black Hawks, who made no major moves.  The team named Ed Litzenberger the new team captain, as the spot was left vacant for the 1957–58 season.

Chicago would get off to a good start, going unbeaten in their first four games, before going on a six-game winless streak to drop them under .500.  The Black Hawks would hover around the .500 mark all season long, and as a result, the team set a club record with 28 victories, and tied the club record by earning 69 points, as the Black Hawks qualified for the post-season for the first time since 1952–53.  Chicago finished in third place, which was their highest finish in the standings since finishing third in the 1945–46 season.

Offensively, Chicago was led by Ed Litzenberger, who led the club with 33 goals and 77 points.  His 77 points tied a club record originally set by Max Bentley in 1943–44.  Tod Sloan finished with 27 goals and 62 points, while Ted Lindsay rebounded from a poor 1957–58 season by scoring 22 goals and 58 points, while leading the NHL with 181 penalty minutes.  Bobby Hull had a solid season, scoring 18 goals and 50 points.  On the blueline, Pierre Pilote led the way, scoring 7 goals and 37 points, while Moose Vasko chipped in with 6 goals and 10 assists for 16 points.

In goal, Glenn Hall had all the playing time for the second straight season, as he won a club record 28 games and posted a 2.97 GAA, along with a shutout.

Chicago would face the Montreal Canadiens in the best of seven NHL semi-final.  The Canadiens finished the year on top of the NHL standings with 91 points, and had won the Stanley Cup three years in a row.  The series opened at the Montreal Forum, and the Canadiens took control of the series, winning the opening two games by scores of 4–2 and 5–1 to take the 2–0 series lead.  The series moved to Chicago Stadium for the next two games, and the Black Hawks responded, winning their first playoff games since 1953, as they defeated Montreal 4–2 and 3–2 to even the series up at two games a piece.  The series returned to Montreal for the fifth game, and the heavily favored Canadiens put the Black Hawks on the brink of elimination with a 4–2 win to take a 3–2 series lead.  Montreal ended the series in the sixth game in Chicago, hanging on for a 5–4 victory to win the series.

Season standings

Record vs. opponents

Game log

Regular season

Montreal Canadiens 4, Chicago Black Hawks 2

Season stats

Scoring leaders

Goaltending

Playoff stats

Scoring leaders

Goaltending

References

Sources
 Hockey-Reference
 National Hockey League Guide & Record Book 2007

Chicago Blackhawks seasons
Chicago
Chicago